My World is a studio album by country music singer Eddy Arnold. It was released in 1965 by RCA Victor.

The album debuted on Billboard magazine's Top Country Albums chart on October 9, 1965, held the No. 1 spot for 17 weeks, and remained on the chart for a total of 44 weeks. The album included two No. 1 hits: "What's He Doing in My World" and "Make the World Go Away". It was the best selling album of Arnold's career.

AllMusic gave the album a rating of three stars.

Track listing
Side A
 "What's He Doing in My World"
 "Too Many Rivers"
 "It Comes and Goes"
 "Make the World Go Away"
 "The Days Gone By"
 "Mary Claire Melvina Rebecca Jane"

Side B
 "I'm Letting You Go"
 "As Usual"
 "I'm Walking Behind You"
 "If You Were Mine, Mary"
 "Taking Chances"
 "You Still Got a Hold on Me"

References

1965 albums
Eddy Arnold albums
RCA Victor albums